is a Japanese long distance runner who specialises in the marathon. She competed in the women's marathon event at the 2016 Summer Olympics.

References

External links
 

1988 births
Living people
People from Narita, Chiba
Japanese female long-distance runners
Japanese female marathon runners
Athletes (track and field) at the 2016 Summer Olympics
Olympic athletes of Japan
Olympic female marathon runners
Sportspeople from Chiba Prefecture
20th-century Japanese women
21st-century Japanese women